The Kadere Party is a political party in the Solomon Islands. It tends to be most popular among those in the shipping and logging industries.

History 
The Kadere Party has been part of coalition governments.

Members of Parliament 

 Ishmael Avui
 Commins Mewa
 Samuel Manetoali
Freda Soria Comua
Bartholomew Parapolo
 Lanelle Tanangada
Willie Marau
John Maneniaru

Electoral history

References 

Political parties in the Solomon Islands
Political parties established in 2014
2010s establishments in the Solomon Islands